Malurus is a genus of bird in the Australasian wren family, Maluridae.

Taxonomy and systematics

Extant species 
The following table reports the English names proposed for the twelve species recognised by the listing of the International Ornithologist Committee

Former species 
Some authorities, either presently or formerly, recognize several additional species as belonging to the genus Malurus including:
 Wallace's fairywren (as Malurus wallacei and Malurus wallacii)
 Broad-billed fairywren (as Malurus grayi)
 Campbell's fairywren (as Malurus campbelli)

References 

 Del Hoyo, J.; Elliot, A. & Christie D. (editors). (2007). Handbook of the Birds of the World. Volume 12: Picathartes to Tits and Chickadees. Lynx Edicions. 

 
Maluridae
Bird genera
Taxa named by Louis Jean Pierre Vieillot
Taxonomy articles created by Polbot